The Adamant Music School is a piano school located in Adamant, Vermont.

Founded in 1942 by pianist Edwine Behre, journalist/poet Alice Mary Kimball and photographer Harry Godfrey, the school has operated continuously as a summer retreat to some of the world's most accomplished and respected pianists - both as students and as instructors.

External links

Music schools in Vermont
Education in Washington County, Vermont
Educational institutions established in 1942
1942 establishments in Vermont
Buildings and structures in Calais, Vermont